Thomas Crane (1808–1859) was an English portrait painter.

Thomas or Tom Crane may also refer to:

Thomas Crane (1843–1903), English illustrator and designer, son of the painter
Thomas Frederick Crane (1844–1927), American folklorist, academic, and lawyer
 Thomas Crane (died 1882), American businessman and namesake of Massachusetts' Thomas Crane Public Library
Thomas Crane, Australian singer and Australia's Got Talent contestant
Tom Crane (footballer) (1921–2010), Australian rules footballer
Tom Crane, character on the 1979 TV series The Omega Factor